Epaphius arsenjevi is a species of ground beetle in the family Carabidae. It is found in Russia.

References

Trechinae